Autonomous oblasts of the Union of Soviet Socialist Republics were administrative units created for a number of smaller nations, which were given autonomy within the fifteen republics of the USSR. According to the constitution of the USSR, autonomous republics, autonomous oblasts and autonomous okrugs had the right, by means of a referendum, to independently resolve the issue of staying in the USSR or in the seceding union republic, as well as to raise the issue of their state-legal status.

Azerbaijan SSR
Nagorno-Karabakh Autonomous Oblast (now Nagorno-Karabakh / Republic of Artsakh)

Georgian SSR
South Ossetian Autonomous Oblast (now Provisional Administration of South Ossetia / Republic of South Ossetia–the State of Alania)

Russian SFSR
While the 1978 Constitution of the RSFSR specified that the autonomous oblasts are subordinated to the krais, this clause was removed in the December 15, 1990, revision, when it was specified that the autonomous oblasts were to be directly subordinated to the Russian SFSR. In June 1991, five autonomous oblasts existed within the RSFSR, four of which were elevated to the status of republic on July 3, 1991:
Adyghe Autonomous Oblast (now Republic of Adygea)
Gorno-Altai Autonomous Oblast (now Altai Republic)
Jewish Autonomous Oblast (independent from Khabarovsk Krai since 1991)
Karachay–Cherkess Autonomous Oblast (now the Karachay–Cherkess Republic)
Khakassian Autonomous Oblast (now Republic of Khakassia)

Other autonomous oblasts also existed at earlier points of the Soviet history:
Chechen Autonomous Oblast (1922–1934; merged into the Chechen-Ingush Autonomous Oblast; now Chechen Republic)
Chechen-Ingush Autonomous Oblast (1934–1936; turned into the Chechen-Ingush ASSR)
Cherkess Autonomous Oblast (Cherkess National District 1926–1928; Cherkess AO 1928–1957; later merged into Karachay–Cherkess AO)
Chuvash Autonomous Oblast (1920–1925; now Chuvash Republic)
Ingush Autonomous Oblast (1924–1934; merged into the Chechen-Ingush Autonomous Oblast; now Republic of Ingushetia)
Kabardino-Balkar Autonomous Oblast (1921–1936; now Kabardino-Balkar Republic)
Kalmyk Autonomous Oblast (1920–1935; now Republic of Kalmykia)
Kara-Kyrgyz Autonomous Oblast (1924–1926; renamed Kyrgyz Autonomous Oblast in 1924, became an autonomous republic in 1926 (Kyrgyz ASSR), a full union republic in 1936 (Kyrgyz SSR), and now the independent state of Kyrgyzstan)
Komi-Zyryan Autonomous Oblast (1922–1936; now Komi Republic)
Mari Autonomous Oblast (1920–1936; now Mari El Republic)
North Ossetian Autonomous Oblast (1924–1936; now Republic of North Ossetia–Alania)
Tuvan Autonomous Oblast (1944–1961; now Tuva Republic)
Udmurt Autonomous Oblast (1920–1934; now Udmurt Republic)
Karakalpak Autonomous Oblast (1925–1932; until 1930 within the Kazakh Autonomous Soviet Socialist Republic, 1930-1932 under direct jurisdictions of the RSFSR, 1932-1936 an autonomous SSR within the RSFSR; from 1936 belongs to the Uzbek SSR; now called Karakalpakstan)

Tajik SSR
Gorno-Badakhshan Autonomous Oblast (now Gorno-Badakhshan Autonomous Region)

Ukrainian SSR
Moldavian Autonomous Oblast (1924; became an autonomous republic (Moldavian ASSR) only months after its formation, a union republic (Moldavian SSR) in 1940, and now the independent Moldova)

See also
Autonomous republics of the Soviet Union
Autonomous okrugs of the Soviet Union
Subdivisions of the Soviet Union

References 

 
Subdivisions of the Soviet Union
Soviet Union
Russian-speaking countries and territories
1920 establishments in Russia
1991 disestablishments in the Soviet Union